Live from the Mountain Music Lounge is a limited edition annual compilation of live musical performances released by radio station KMTT 103.7 FM in Seattle, Washington. All performances are recorded in a small, intimate stage setting called the Carter Subaru Mountain Music Lounge, located within the building of the station's offices in the Denny Triangle area of Seattle. Featured artists represent the long-time Adult Album Alternative music format for which the station was prominently known from 1991 to 2011 prior to a switch to its current Classic rock-heavy Triple-A format in November 2011.

Under the title On the Mountain: Collector's Edition of Live Performances, KMTT self-published the first compilation of recorded songs and released them through local Seattle retailers in November 1995. Following the success of the first album, the station began an annual tradition of publishing compilations, with portions of the proceeds donated to the benefit of The Wilderness Society. Each year, KMTT selects a single retailer to exclusively offer the CDs. Past retailers have included Starbucks, REI, and Fred Meyer.

Starting with the ninth volume, the series was retitled Live from the Mountain Music Lounge. As of November 2012, there have been 18 volumes released, including a double-album for the tenth installment that featured a tenth volume and a collection of the "best" tracks from the first nine volumes.

Albums

Live albums

Track listings

On the Mountain: Collector's Edition of Live Performances track listing

Captured Live: On the Mountain 2 track listing

On the Mountain 3 track listing

On the Mountain 4 track listing

On the Mountain 5 track listing

On the Mountain Six track listing

On the Mountain 7 track listing

Bonus track listing

On the Mountain 8 track listing

Live from the Mountain Music Lounge Volume 9 track listing

Live from the Mountain Music Lounge Volume 10 track listing

Disc 1

Disc 2: Best of Volumes 1–9

Live from the Mountain Music Lounge Volume 11 track listing

Live from the Mountain Music Lounge Volume 12 track listing

Live from the Mountain Music Lounge Volume 13 track listing

Live from the Mountain Music Lounge Volume 14 track listing

Live from the Mountain Music Lounge Volume 15 track listing

Live from the Mountain Music Lounge Volume 16 track listing

Live from the Mountain Music Lounge Volume 17 track listing

Live from the Mountain Music Lounge Volume 18 – The Essential Collection track listing

References

External links
103.7 The Mountain
The Carter Subaru Mountain Music Lounge Archive

Rock music group discographies
Discographies of American artists
Alternative rock discographies